Kevin Lampkin (born 20 December 1972) is a former professional footballer who played for Liverpool, Huddersfield Town, Mansfield Town & Ilkeston Town.

References

1972 births
Living people
English footballers
English Football League players
Association football defenders
Liverpool F.C. players
Huddersfield Town A.F.C. players
Mansfield Town F.C. players
Ilkeston Town F.C. (1945) players
Footballers from Liverpool
Association football midfielders